Robert J. "Bob" Aylward (born August 13, 1946) is a land surveyor and former politician in Newfoundland. He represented Kilbride in the Newfoundland House of Assembly from 1979 to 1993.

The son of Augustus Aylward and Mary Murphy, he was born in Kilbride and was educated at Saint Bonaventure's College. Aylward was licensed as a surveyor in 1968 and practised until 1979 when he was elected to the Newfoundland assembly. He was president of the Association of Newfoundland Land Surveyors. In 1969, he married Jean C. Stead.

Aylward served in the provincial cabinet as Minister of Rural, Agricultural and Northern Development, as Minister of Forest Resources and as Minister of Municipal Affairs and Housing. After leaving politics, he operated a farm. Aylward was a member of the 2006 Electoral Districts Boundaries Commission.

References 

1946 births
Living people
Progressive Conservative Party of Newfoundland and Labrador MHAs
Members of the Executive Council of Newfoundland and Labrador